The Americas Zone was the unique zone within Group 4 of the regional Davis Cup competition in 2022. The zone's competition was held in round robin format in Tacarigua, Trinidad and Tobago, from 1 to 6 August 2022.

Participating nations

Draw
Date: 1–6 August 2022

Location: National Racquet Centre, Tacarigua, Trinidad and Tobago (hard)

Format: Round-robin basis. One pool of five teams and one pool of four teams. The top two finishers of each pool will play-off against each other to determine the two nations promoted to Americas Group III in 2023.

Seeding

 1Davis Cup Rankings as of 7 March 2022

Round Robin

Pool A

Pool B

Standings are determined by: 1. number of wins; 2. number of matches; 3. in two-team ties, head-to-head records; 4. in three-team ties, (a) percentage of sets won (head-to-head records if two teams remain tied), then (b) percentage of games won (head-to-head records if two teams remain tied), then (c) Davis Cup rankings.

Playoffs 

Round Robin

Pool A

Bermuda vs. Haiti

Honduras vs. Antigua and Barbuda

Bermuda vs. Antigua and Barbuda

Honduras vs. Haiti

Bermuda vs. Honduras

Antigua and Barbuda vs. Haiti

Pool B

Cuba vs. U.S. Virgin Islands

Trinidad and Tobago vs. Aruba

Cuba vs. Trinidad and Tobago

U.S. Virgin Islands vs. Nicaragua

U.S. Virgin Islands vs. Aruba

Cuba vs. Nicaragua

Cuba vs. Aruba

Trinidad and Tobago vs. Nicaragua

U.S. Virgin Islands vs. Trinidad and Tobago

Aruba vs. Nicaragua

Play-offs

Promotional play-offs

Bermuda vs. Cuba

Aruba vs. Honduras

5th place play-offs

Antigua and Barbuda vs. Nicaragua

7th place play-offs

Haiti vs. Trinidad and Tobago

References

External links
Official Website

Davis Cup Americas Zone
Americas Zone